Illinois Route 21 (IL 21) is an arterial north–south state highway in northeastern Illinois. It runs from Illinois Route 43 (Harlem Avenue) in Niles to U.S. Route 41 (Skokie Highway) north of Gurnee. Illinois 21 is 28.13 miles (45.27 km) long.

Along most of its length, Illinois 21 is called Milwaukee Avenue. North of Gurnee, it is called Riverside Drive.

Route description

Illinois 21 was the principal route to Milwaukee, Wisconsin before the construction of both the Skokie Highway and the Tri-State Tollway (Interstate 94 and Interstate 294). The towns of Glenview, Libertyville, and Gurnee are principally located along this road. It follows the Des Plaines River for its entire length, and overlaps U.S. Route 45 between Lincolnshire and Prospect Heights.

South of Illinois 43, Milwaukee Avenue remains a major arterial road until it reaches the downtown area of Chicago, where its historical terminus at Lake Street has been moved back to Grand Avenue. It is one of the few diagonal streets in the grid street layout of Chicago.

History
SBI Route 21 ran from Chicago to Antioch along Milwaukee Avenue and current Illinois Routes 43, 83 and 137. In Chicago, it also ran along Elston Avenue. In 1940, the route was moved to a new route to Grayslake, and then continued to Antioch. In 1963, Illinois 21 was dropped entirely from Grayslake to Antioch, and in 1972, it was shortened further to its current southern terminus at Illinois 43. The next year, Illinois 21 was rerouted to Gurnee. Illinois 83 and 137 replaced the old Route 21 to (and through) Grayslake.

Major intersections

References

External links

 Illinois Highway Ends: Illinois Route 21

021
Transportation in Cook County, Illinois
Transportation in Lake County, Illinois